Alma Uy-Lampasa (born August 1, 1971) is a Filipino law professor, judge and politician who served as a provincial board member of the 2nd legislative district of Samar.

Early life 
Uy was born in Catbalogan, Samar.

She is the wife of Judge Cicero Lampasa, the Presiding Judge of Regional Trial Court-Branch 27 in Catbalogan.

Career

Legal career 
Uy became the Presiding Judge of Municipal Circuit Trial Courts (MCTC) of municipalities of Daram, Zumarraga and Motiong and Assisting Judge of the MTCC of Calbayog.

Political career 
She served as a board member of the Sangguniang Panlalawigan under the 2nd legislative district of Samar province. In the 2019 local election, she ran for the position of councilor of city of Catbalogan and won.

Academic career 
Uy is a part-time instructor at Saint Mary's College of Catbalogan handling law-related subjects.

Controversies

Violation of notarial practice 
Uy was accused by Rolando Ko of violating the Rules of Notarial Practice and breaching the Code of Professional Responsibility. The case was filed and reached the Supreme Court of the Philippines. She was found guilty and was suspended of practicing law for six months. Her notarial commission was revoked, and she was prohibited from being commissioned as a notary public for two years.

Politically motivated ambush 
In July 2014, Uy's car was ambushed in Jiabong, Samar; she survived. She believed that politics was behind the incident.

‘Bullying’ accusation 
Uy accused Samar's Sangguniang Panlalawigan Presiding Chair then Vice Governor Stephen James “Jimboy” Tan of bullying by prohibited her from asking questions and raising some points during their regular sessions.

Samar capitol 800 million loan issue 
Uy was the lone board member of Samar province who opposed the passage of a “borrowing ordinance” which gives Ex-Governor now Congresswoman Sharee Ann Tan blanket authority to enter into a contract of loan with the Development Bank of the Philippines (DBP) or Land Bank of the Philippines (LBP) for the said amount. The petition filed by her was junked by the Regional Trial Court (RTC) Branch 29.

References 

Filipino women in politics
Living people
Filipino women judges
1971 births